Baldwin Lake is a sag pond in the Los Angeles County Arboretum and Botanic Garden, which is in the San Gabriel Valley of Southern California, south of the San Gabriel Mountains. The pond, arboretum, and botanic garden are all within the city of Arcadia.

The pond is fed by stormwater and natural springs; water flows out of the pond to the aquifer at Raymond Fault, and on to the Rio Hondo. Baldwin Lake is part of the Los Angeles River watershed.

History
For hundreds of years before the Spanish colonization of Alta California displaced them in the late 18th century, Tongva people lived near the pond in a settlement called Alyeupkigna. The Spanish forced the Tongva to move to a reduction at the Mission San Gabriel Arcángel. At the site of the Tongva settlement, the Spanish established Alyeupkigna Rancheria in 1800, as an agricultural outpost of the mission.

The Hugo Reid Adobe was built by Scottish−Mexican Hugo Reid on the shore of the pond in 1840. Reid received the full Mexican land grant for Rancho Santa Anita in 1845, with included 'Baldwin Lake' and numerous other artesian sag ponds and springs within its 3 square leagues (13,319 acres).

Elias Jackson “Lucky” Baldwin purchased Rancho Santa Anita in 1875. Baldwin Lake served as a holding reservoir for ranch irrigation projects.

Baldwin built the elaborate Coach Barn near the pond in 1879, and the Queen Anne style  'Baldwin's Belvedere' or Santa Anita Ranch Guest Cottage on a peninsula surrounded by the waters in 1885−1886. The Queen Anne Cottage and Coach Barn are listed on the National Register of Historic Places and California Historical Landmarks. The Reid-Baldwin Adobe, remodeled and enlarged by Lucky Baldwin into his main ranch residence, is a California Historical Landmark.

In 1947 the state and county acquired the land to create an arboretum around the pond and historic Baldwin structures.

Wildlife
Baldwin Lake is the home for many different forms of wildlife including numerous ducks, Canada geese and turtles. There are occasional great egrets also.

Pollution
The Save Baldwin Lake project is currently accessing how to address accumulated sediments, collapsing shorelines, reduced water depth, Raymond aquifer recharging, and the threatened aquatic ecosystems of Baldwin Lake and adjacent Tule Pond.

A preliminary study identified several factors that negatively impact Baldwin Lake. The runoff carrying petrochemicals and other contaminants into the pond, combined with ongoing siltation, has degraded its aquatic ecosystems.

The Arboretum began fundraising for an engineering study to determine the best approaches to restoring Baldwin Lake and Tule Pond.

See also

 
 
 Baldwin Avenue Railway Station
 National Register of Historic Places listings in Los Angeles County, California

References

Lakes of Los Angeles County, California
Arcadia, California
Geography of the San Gabriel Valley
Tributaries of the Los Angeles River